The 52 members of the Parliament of Vanuatu from 2004 to 2008 were elected on 6 July 2004.

List of members

References

 2004